Ketcherside Mountain is a summit in Iron County in the U.S. state of Missouri. Hogan and Hogan Mountain lie to the west-southwest. 

Ketcherside Mountain has the name of the local Ketcherside (or Catcherside) family.

References

Mountains of Iron County, Missouri
Mountains of Missouri